The Eifeler Regel (meaning "Eifel Rule"; in Luxembourgish also spelled Äifler Regel ) is a linguistic phenomenon originally documented in the dialects of the Eifel region in the far west of Germany during the late 19th century. The rule describes a phonological process in the languages which causes the deletion of final  in certain contexts, and may be reflected in spelling.

More generally called n-apocope, it appears to varying extents in all dialects of the Western group of High German, including West Central German (notably Luxembourgish, Colognian and Hessian), High Franconian and Alemannic; and excludes all dialects of the Eastern group, such as Austro-Bavarian and the colonial dialects east of the Elbe-Saale line (including Standard German and Yiddish). N-apocope is a linguistic change originating in speech during the Middle High German period.

West Central German

Luxembourgish 
The Eifel Rule is pervasive in Luxembourgish and its effects are indicated in the standard orthography. Final ⟨n⟩ or ⟨nn⟩ are often lost when followed by another consonant other than ⟨n⟩, ⟨d⟩, ⟨t⟩, ⟨z⟩ or ⟨h⟩. Compare the following examples involving the definite article den ("the"):
den Apel ("the apple"), den Tuerm ("the tower"), but de Ball ("the ball")

Since Luxembourgish orthography strives for phonetic accuracy, the deletion of n is also reflected in writing. The Eifeler Regel is presented as a spelling rule, but its correct application still depends on a knowledge of spoken Luxembourgish. The rule targets words ending in -n or -nn, and since that is an extremely common ending for verbs, plural nouns, and function words (e.g. articles, pronouns, prepositions) in Luxembourgish, its effects are widespread. The basic rule can be described as follows:

Final -n(n) is deleted before another consonant.
(between words) den + Ball → de Ball ("the ball"), wann + mer ginn → wa mer ginn ("when we go")
(in compound words) Dammen + Schong → Dammeschong ("women's shoes")
It is not deleted:
before the consonants n, d, t, z, or h
den Tuerm ("the tower"), wann hien drénkt ("when he drinks")
Gromperenzalot ("potato salad"), fënnefandrësseg ("thirty-five")
before a vowel
den Apel ("the apple"), wann ech ginn ("when I go")
Ouerenentzündung ("ear infection")
at the end of a sentence or before a punctuation mark
Ech hunn (wéi gëschter) vill geschafft. ("I have (like yesterday) done a lot of work.")
Deletion is optional before the following function words beginning in s: säin, si/se/s, sech, seng, sou (and perhaps others).

Many words ending in -n or -nn are not affected by the Eifeler Regel:
proper nouns: Schuman, Johann, München
loanwords: Roman, Maschin(n), nouns ending in -ioun
the prefix on-: onvergiesslech ("unforgettable")
most nouns and adjectives (for historical reasons): Mann (man), dënn (thin), Kroun (crown), Loun (salary), blann (blind), Reen (rain), …
In fact, n as a stem consonant (as opposed to part of a grammatical ending) is generally stable in content words, with notable exceptions such as Wäi(n) (wine), Stee(n) (stone), geschwë(nn) (soon).

When final -n is dropped from a plural noun whose singular form also ends in -e (which occurs mostly in loanwords), a diaeresis must be used to distinguish the plural:
Chance (singular ), Chancen (plural, full form ), Chancë (plural + Eifel Rule )

 Colognian 
In Colognian, the Eifeler Regel is of lesser impact than further south. This is due in part to slight morphological differences between the Moselle Franconian languages of the upper Eifel regions (High Eifel and Schneifel), and the Ripuarian languages of the North- and Vordereifel region and the Cologne Lowland, to which Colognian belongs.

There are several ways to write Colognian, and the Eifeler Regel may be reflected in writing when it follows phonetic reality, but more often is not, since the majority of people do not write very phonetically.

In comparison to standard German, Colognian is often described as having historically omitted the trailing n. This is oversimplified, and not always true. The Colognian version of liaison sometimes inserts an n. Colognian multisyllabic base words or lexemes regularly drop "-n" when some related languages, such as Standard German and Low German (but not Dutch and Limburgish) do not. Liaison is often optional, and there is hardly any liaison on stressed words within a sentence.

The general rule is that monosyllabic words most often keep their trailing n, while otherwise -en endings are transformed to -e in Colognian unless the following word starts with a glottal stop, a dental consonant, a vowel, or an h, and neither of the two words is being stressed inside the sentence. There are exceptions, the most notable being that speakers do not use liaison even if they could when speaking very slowly or solemnly, e.g. preaching or praying.

 High Franconian 
High Franconian is a transitional dialect group between the Rhine Franconian dialects of West Central German to the North and the Swabian dialects of Alemannic to the South. The High Franconian group divides into South Franconian and East Franconian. N-apocope can be documented in the following sentence from Standard German:
Die Kinder halte-n die Äpfel fest. "The children hold on to the apples."
The comparison with the above mentioned dialects demonstrates:
Rhine Franconian: Die Kinner halte die Äppel fescht.South Frankonian: Die Kinner halte die Äpfel fescht.East Frankonian: Die Kinner halte die Äpfel fest.
Swabian: Die Kinner haltet die Äpfel fescht.

 Alemannic 
The Eifeler Regel (Alemannic n-apocope) applies in all variants of Alemannic in the same fashion as described for Luxembourgish and is subject to the same exceptions. The earliest report on the phenomenon in Alemannic goes back to 1881.

Certain Swiss German dialects also exhibit Eifeler Regel. A comparison, in Zurich German, would be:
"Wötsch en Äpfe?" remains as "Wötsch en Äpfe?" ("Do you want an apple?"), but
"Wötsch en Gipfel?" changes to "Wötsch e' Gipfel?" ("Do you want a croissant?").

Low Franconian 

Certain southern and southeastern dialects of Low Franconian (that is, Dutch) have a similar phenomenon. It is notable in Limburgish and some areas of Brabantian, and is called the "bdht-vowel-rule". Final -n is also deleted in these dialects, except when followed by b, d, h, t or a vowel, in case of a masculine noun. This is similar to the Eifeler regel.

References

Bibliography
 
 
 online: Cote LB 55442
 
 online: https://www.webcitation.org/5n2evmQ8P?url=http://massard.info/pdf/finalen_n.pdf
 
 

Central German languages
Eifel
Phonology